Chiquinquirá is a town and municipality in the Colombian Department of Boyacá, part of the subregion of the Western Boyacá Province.

Etymology 
The name Chiquinquirá comes from Chibcha and means "Place of swamps covered with fog".

Geography and religion 
Chiquinquirá is constituted by two zones: the urban zone or town which is formed by approximately 40 neighbourhoods between the strata 1 and 4, and the rural zone which is divided in 17 sub zones located around the city.

It is home to the Basílica de Chiquinquirá, which houses the image of the Virgen de Chiquinquirá, the patroness saint of Colombia.  Chiquinquirá is a major point of religious pilgrimage (source:  Colombia Lonely Planet Guide, 2nd Edition, 1995).

History 
The area of Chiquinquirá used to be inhabited by the Muisca before the Spanish conquest and Chiquinquirá was an important place in the Chiquinquirá Valley. It was ruled by an independent cacique within the Muisca Confederation. It was never properly founded as a municipality.

In November, 1967, 81 people in Chiquinquirá, most of them children, were fatally poisoned and hundreds more became seriously ill after eating bread that had been made with flour that had been contaminated with a powdered insecticide.

Murder charges would later be filed against a Bogotá truck driver who had delivered the flour and the owner of the bakery that had baked and sold the bread to local residents.

Geology 
The Chiquinquirá Sandstone is named after the town.

Gallery

References 

Municipalities of Boyacá Department
Muisca Confederation
Muysccubun